The castles displayed on each map are those listed in the List of castles in England for the corresponding county.
Click on the red or green dot to display a detailed map showing the location of the castle.  Green dots represent for the most part castles of which substantial remains survive, red dots represent castles of which only earthworks or vestiges survive, or in a few cases castles of which there are no visible remains.

Lancashire

Leicestershire

Lincolnshire

Merseyside

Norfolk

Northamptonshire

Northumberland

North Yorkshire

Nottinghamshire

Oxfordshire

Rutland

Shropshire

Somerset

South Yorkshire

Staffordshire

Suffolk

Surrey

Tyne and Wear

Warwickshire

West Midlands

West Sussex

West Yorkshire

Wiltshire

Worcestershire

See also 
 Maps of castles in England by county: B–K